Niyazi Serhat Akın (born 5 June 1981) is a retired Turkish footballer who played as a striker.

Career

Fenerbahçe
He played for Fenerbahçe SK between 2000–2005 and played 140 matches (147 for the Süper Lig), after which he went to Anderlecht on a free transfer in the summer of 2005.

RSC Anderlecht and 1. FC Köln (2005–2008)
In 2005, Akin joined the Belgian R.S.C. Anderlecht. He wore the number 24 jersey for the Mauves, with the number 9 jersey worn by the more senior Mbo Mpenza. In his first year at Anderlecht, he helped them become champions of the Belgian First Division, by scoring the first goal in their 2–0 victory over direct rivals Standard Liège three matchdays from the end of the season.

In the winter transfer window or 2006–07, he was loaned out to Second Bundesliga side 1. FC Köln due to the lack of opportunities and having lower seniority than Nicolas Frutos, Mohammed Tchite and Mbo Mpenza. He received further setback in the 2006–07 season when he had stomach injuries which kept him sidelined for half a year. However, with the transfer of Tchite, and the injury to Frutos in the early part of the 2007–08 Jupiler League, Akin returned to the starting eleven of Anderlecht. He repaid the faith of his manager Franky Vercauteren, scoring two vital goals in the UEFA Cup tie against Rapid Vienna and sending the Belgian team into the group stage of the second-tier European competition. Akin said it was a "small miracle" to be part of the Anderlecht team again. This brief period of goals was interrupted by another injury to the striker, causing him to miss out an opportunity to cement his spot in the Anderlecht team.

Kocaelispor
Akın signed a one-year contract for the 2008–09 season with the recently promoted Turkish Super League side Kocaelispor. However, after six months with Kocaelispor, he left the team as Kocaelispor could not pay his wages.

Karlsruhe
In November 2009, he signed a contract with Karlsruher Sport Club until 30 June 2010.

Turgutluspor
Akın returned to Turkey after accepting an offer from his old teammate Yusuf Simsek who was appointed as the player-manager for the TFF Second League team. According to his manager, Akın has grown into a more humble player as his fame deteriorated.

International career
He played 16 times for Turkey and scored three goals. He also played 22 times for Turkey Under 21 and scored 12 goals.

Honours
Fenerbahçe S.K.
 Süper Lig: 2000–01, 2003–04, 2004–05

R.S.C. Anderlecht
 Belgian Pro League: 2005–06

References

1981 births
Living people
People from Bretten
Sportspeople from Karlsruhe (region)
Turkish footballers
Turkey international footballers
Turkey under-21 international footballers
Turkey youth international footballers
German footballers
German people of Turkish descent
Turkish expatriate footballers
Turkish expatriate sportspeople in Belgium
1. FC Köln players
Fenerbahçe S.K. footballers
Kocaelispor footballers
Karlsruher SC players
Konyaspor footballers
R.S.C. Anderlecht players
Turgutluspor footballers
Altay S.K. footballers
Berliner AK 07 players
Süper Lig players
Belgian Pro League players
Bundesliga players
2. Bundesliga players
Expatriate footballers in Belgium
Association football forwards
Footballers from Baden-Württemberg